According to the Acts of the Apostles, the Synagogue of the Libertines (e.g. KJV, Wycliffe Bible) or Synagogue of the Freedmen (e.g. NKJV, NRSV) were a group of Hellenistic Jews who disputed with Saint Stephen (Acts 6:9).

The Greek text of this verse reads:

or in English:
Then there arose certain of the synagogue, which is called the synagogue of the Libertines, and Cyrenians, and Alexandrians, and of them of Cilicia and of Asia, disputing with Stephen.

Libertines
The meaning of Libertine in this passage is different from the generally understood connotation of "a dissolute person". In this instance, "libertine" refers to one has been "liberated", that is, a former slave, or freedman. Those attending this particular synagogue might also include the descendants of such freedmen.  

Opinion is divided as to the number of synagogues named here. The probability is that there are three, corresponding to the geographical regions involved, Rome and Italy, North East Africa, and Asia Minor. In this case the Synagogue of the Libertines is the assembly of the Freedmen from Rome, descendants of the Jews enslaved by Pompey after his conquest of Judea in 63 BC. However,  taken closely together, the first name must denote the people of some city or district. The obscure town Libertum (inferred from the title Episcopus Libertinensis in connection with the synod of Carthage, AD 411) is less likely than the reading  underlying certain Armenian versions and Syriac commentaries. The Greek towns lying west from Cyrene would naturally be called Libyan. Consequently, these returned Jews, instead of being liberalized by their residence abroad, were more tenacious of Judaism and more bitter against Stephen than those who had never left Judea.

References

Acts of the Apostles
Jewish–Christian debate
Imperial Roman slaves and freedmen